Laut may refer to:

Places 
 Laut Island, South Kalimantan, Indonesia
 Laut Island, Natuna Regency, Riau Islands, Indonesia
 Nusa Laut, an island in Maluku, Indonesia

People 
 Agnes Christina Laut (1871–1936), Canadian journalist, novelist, historian, and social worker
 Dave Laut (1956–2009), American athlete
 Frank Laut (1884–1961), Canadian politician
 Gerard Yepes Laut (born 2002), Spanish footballer
 Peter Laut, Danish physicist

Other uses 
 Laut.de, German online magazine

See also 
 
 Serui-Laut language
 Nusa Laut language
 Orang Laut language
 Wadapi-Laut language
 Lout (disambiguation)